The 2000 Country Music Association Awards, 34th Ceremony, was held on October 4, 2000 at the Grand Ole Opry House, Nashville, Tennessee, and was hosted by CMA Award Winner, Vince Gill. Faith Hill lead the night with 6 nominations, including Album of the Year, and Entertainer of the Year.

Winners and Nominees 
Winner are in Bold.

References 

Country Music Association
CMA
Country Music Association Awards
Country Music Association Awards
Country Music Association Awards
Country Music Association Awards
21st century in Nashville, Tennessee
Events in Nashville, Tennessee